Thomas McCraney (July 22, 1791 - May 21, 1855) was an Iowa settler who served as a member of the 1st Wisconsin Territorial Assembly during the era when the Iowa District was still part of Wisconsin Territory. He later served in the 1846 Iowa constitutional convention.

References 

1791 births
1855 deaths
Members of the Wisconsin Territorial Legislature
Place of birth missing